The Hot Mix 5 are an American DJ team originating from Chicago, Illinois, who were chosen by WBMX Program Director, Lee Michaels in 1981. The founding members were Farley "Funkin" Keith (later known as Farley "Jackmaster" Funk), Mickey "Mixin" Oliver, Ralphi Rosario, Kenny "Jammin" Jason, and Scott "Smokin" Silz. In 1984, Scott Silz was asked to leave the group and was replaced by Julian "Jumpin" Perez in 1985, as the winner of a HMF sponsored DJ Battle. Another DJ, Jeff Davis, was supposed to be a sixth member, but Silz mentioned in an interview that he never showed up, leaving just the five members. Julian's tenure as a member was about a year and then, Mario "Smokin" Diaz, became a member of the group and played with them throughout their radio time in Chicago.

Background
Created to act as the resident DJs on Chicago FM radio station (now defunct) WBMX's Saturday Night Live Ain't No Jive mix show hosted by Armando Rivera, the members quickly established themselves as a force to be reckoned with. Soon Friday Night Jams, Mini Mixes and specialty edited remixes were added. The Chicago house music scene exploded as the Hot Mix 5 show and WBMX became the #1 radio show in Chicago, by airing a new sound called house music that was presented by their unique style of turntablism. Mickey Oliver became known by his editing and turntable skills, and Farley, Ralphi and Kenny each had their own unique styles. Soon the Hot Mix 5 Radio show became known all over the world as their mixes were recorded on cassette tapes and sent across America and abroad. Together, with their turntable skills and this new genre that emerged called house music, they broke most every Chicago house music records and Italo disco tracks, while airing to millions of Chicago listeners. Together, the've became legends as their mixes are still being sold today on the likes of eBay and other outlets. Many of the Top Djs in the world have recognized the Hot Mix 5 as their mentors, as to setting the bar of what a DJ can be.

The City of Chicago, recognized the Hot Mix 5's contribution to the creation of house music and honored them by presenting each member with an individual street named after them and in addition a street called "Hot Mix 5 Way", which is located in downtown Chicago on the corner of Michigan Avenue and Balbo Drive. Kenny Jason was presented with a street sign which is called DJ Kenny Jammin Jason Boulevard, located on the corner of Kedzie and Logan Blvd near Logan Square in Chicago. Farley also received a street sign which is located at 13th & Michigan, also in Chicago. Today, The Hot Mix 5 DJs continue to perform globally spreading the sound of house music. Mickey has a TV show called Intensi-T, a live stage show at the Planet Hollywood complex on the Las Vegas Strip, and mentioned as a Grammy semi finalist in 2012. Ralphi, a Grammy finalist in 2013, has produced recordings for many major recording artists with countless charting hits. Farley has continued his DJ career by performing globally, and producing. Kenny's Addicted to Radio station has been nominated as one of America's top radio stations.

References

External links
Hot Mix 5 website
Hot Mix 5 Records website
Farley's website
Mickey Oliver's website
Ralphi Rosario's website
Kenny Jason's website
Scott Silz's website
WBMX

American DJs
DJs from Chicago
American house musicians
Radio personalities from Chicago